The TIM/TOM complex is a protein complex in cellular biochemistry which translocates proteins produced from nuclear DNA through the mitochondrial membrane for use in oxidative phosphorylation. In enzymology, the complex is described as an mitochondrial protein-transporting ATPase, or more systematically ATP phosphohydrolase (mitochondrial protein-importing), as the TIM part requires ATP hydrolysis to work.

Only 13 proteins necessary for a mitochondrion are actually coded in mitochondrial DNA.  The vast majority of proteins destined for the mitochondria are encoded in the nucleus and synthesised in the cytoplasm.  These are tagged by an N-terminal or/and a C-terminal signal sequence. Following transport through the cytosol from the nucleus, the signal sequence is recognized by a receptor protein in the translocase of the outer membrane (TOM) complex.  The signal sequence and adjacent portions of the polypeptide chain are inserted in the TOM complex, then begin interaction with a translocase of the inner membrane (TIM) complex, which are hypothesized to be transiently linked at sites of close contact between the two membranes.  The signal sequence is then translocated into the matrix in a process that requires an electrochemical hydrogen ion gradient across the inner membrane.  Mitochondrial Hsp70 binds to regions of the polypeptide chain and maintains it in an unfolded state as it moves into the matrix.

The ATPase domain is essential during the interactions of the proteins Hsp70 and subunit Tim44. Without the presence of ATPase, carboxy-terminal segment is not able to bind to protein of Tim44. As mtHsp70 transmits the nucleotide state of the ATPase domain with alpha-helices A and B, Tim44 interacts with the peptide binding domain to coordinate the protein bind.

TIC/TOC Complex vs. TIM/TOM Complex
This protein complex is functionally analogous to the TIC/TOC complex located on the inner and outer membranes of the chloroplast, in the sense that it transports proteins into the membrane of the mitochondria. Although they both hydrolyze triphosphates, they are evolutionally unrelated.

References

External links 
 TCDB 3.A.8 - description of the entire complex
 Overview of the various import ways into mitochondria (group of N. Pfanner)
 

Transport proteins
Mitochondria
Transmembrane proteins
EC 3.6.3
EC 7.4.2
Enzymes of unknown structure